Samanta Schweblin (born 1978) is an Argentine author currently based in Berlin, Germany. She has published three collections of short stories, a novella and a novel, besides stories that have appeared in anthologies and magazines such as The New Yorker, Granta,The Drawbridge, Harper’s Magazine and McSweeney’s.

Life and career

She has won numerous prestigious awards around the world and her books have been
translated into more than thirty languages and adapted for film.

In 2002, Schweblin published her first book El núcleo del Disturbio (The Nucleus of Disturbances), which won an award from Argentina's National Endowment for the Arts. In 2008, she won the Casa de las Americas award for her short story collection Mouthful of Birds. Her third collection of short-stories, Siete casas vacías (Seven Empty Houses) was published in 2015. Her first novel Distancia de Rescate, literally “Rescue distance”, but translated into English as Fever Dream, won the 2015 Tigre Juan Award and the 2017 Shirley Jackson Award for Best Novella, and was shortlisted for the 2017 Man Booker International Prize.

In 2019 she was nominated for the Man Booker International Prize for the English translation by American literary translator Megan McDowell of Mouthful of Birds. In
2020 she was again longlisted for the Man Booker International Prize, for Kentukis (Little Eyes), also translated by McDowell.

Her novel Distancia de Rescate was adapted into a film by Netflix in 2021, directed by Claudia Llosa and with the screenplay co-written by Llosa and the author.

In the winter semester of 2020/2021, she held the Samuel Fischer guest professorship for literature in the Peter Szondi-Institut für Allgemeine und Vergleichende Literaturwissenschaft at the Free University of Berlin.

Bibliography
 2002, El núcleo del disturbio
 2009, Pájaros en la boca
 Also published as La Furia de las pestes
 Translated by Megan McDowell as Mouthful of Birds (2019)
 2014, Distancia de rescate
 Translated by Megan McDowell as Fever Dream (2017) Shirley Jackson Award
 2015, Siete casas vacías
 Translated by Megan McDowell as Seven Empty Houses (2022)
 2018, Kentukis
 Translated by Megan McDowell as Little Eyes (2020)

Awards and honors 

 2022: National Book Award for Translated Literature for Seven Empty Houses

References

External links

Samanta Schweblin's Twitter
Agencia Literaria Carmen Balcells

20th-century Argentine writers
21st-century Argentine writers
Argentine women short story writers
1978 births
Living people
Argentine people of German descent
Writers from Buenos Aires
20th-century short story writers
21st-century short story writers
21st-century Argentine women writers
20th-century Argentine women writers
National Book Award winners